Huzaima bint Nasser (1884 – 27 March 1935) was an Arabian princess, Sharifa of Mecca. She was Queen of Syria and then Queen of Iraq by marriage to Faisal I of Iraq, and queen mother during the reign of her son.

Biography

Her father was Amir Nasser Pasha. Her mother was Dilber Khanum.  She was the younger twin of Musbah. 

In 1904, in Istanbul, she married the prince Faisal son of the Sharif of Mecca. Their first born was Azza (1906–1960), followed by Rajiha (1907–1959) and Raifi'a (1910–1934), and finally by Ghazi (1912–1939), the future king of Iraq.

Queen of Syria

After World War I, the former dominions of the Ottoman Empire were divided between the European nations, or proclaimed independent.
In 1920, Faisal was proclaimed king of Syria, and so Hazima became queen of Syria. In order to reach her husband, she moved with her children into the new established royal palace in Damascus. 
After only four months of reign, the kingdom of Syria was dissolved after the Franco-Syrian War, and so both Faisal and Hazima lost their titles.

Queen of Iraq

In 1921, the British government decided to put Faisal as king of the new Kingdom of Iraq, over which they had an international mandate. He accepted and he was proclaimed king of Iraq. Hazima became queen, and the royal family was transferred to Baghdad the capital of the new kingdom.

After the arrival of the queen in Bagdad in 1924, Gertrude Bell was the first to be given an audience. Bell had been entrusted by the King to manage the affairs of his family's household, and arranged for the Circassian Madame Jaudet Beg to be named lady-in-waiting or mistress of ceremonies to the queen, and the for Miss Fairley, the English governess to the crown prince, to instruct the princesses in European etiquette.

Gertrude Bell had a good first impression by the queen and described both her and her daughters as beautiful, sensitive and shy. However, the queen was not pleased with the influence the king had granted Gertrude Bell within the household. She disliked the arrangements Bell made for the education of the crown prince, and in 1925, she banished Maryam Safwat from the palace because she suspected Bell for attempting to arrange a marriage between Safwat and the king.

King Faisal did not feel it be politically wise for the queen and princesses to participate in public life in the Western manner. Queen Huzaima and her daughters lived secluded in purdah in the Harthiya villa and did not appear in public or in any mixed-gender company. While the King entertained male guests at the Palace, the queen and her daughters received women guests in the Harthiya villa and visited all-female partiers. They dressed covered in veils in public, but under their veil, they eventually dressed in Western fashion ordered from London, only shown at the women-only parties.

She showed an interest in the Iraqi women's movement. In 1924, she and the king gave an audience to the first women's organisation in Iraq, the Women's Awakening Club, to whom they showed patronage.  In 1932, queen Huzaima attended the Third Eastern Women's Congress, which was held in Baghdad, and gave the welcome opening speech.

Faisal died in 1933, and was succeeded by his son Ghazi, and so Huzaima became queen mother of Iraq.

She died in Baghdad two years later, in 1935.

Children
She had four children: 
Princess Azza bint Faisal.
Princess Rajiha bint Faisal.
Princess Raifia bint Faisal.
Ghazi, King of Iraq born 1912 died 4 April 1939, married his first cousin, Princess Aliya bint Ali, daughter of King Ali of Hejaz.

See also

 List of Syrian monarchs
 Timeline of Syrian history

References

External links
 

|-

Iraqi royalty
1884 births
1935 deaths
Arab queens
Queen mothers